Jerzy Passendorfer (April 8, 1923 in Wilno – February 20, 2003 in Skolimów, near Warsaw, Poland) was a Polish film director, specialising in films about the German occupation of Poland in World War II, and member of parliament.

Passendorfer graduated from the Film and TV School of the Academy of Performing Arts in Prague in 1951, and went on to become the leading exponent of the popular "national combatant" genre in the 1960s. As well as many films he directed the popular TV serial Janosik.

Passendorfer served in the Sejm, the lower house of the Polish parliament, from 1993 to 1997 on the Democratic Left Alliance list.

Filmography
 Signals (1959)
 Assassination (1959)
 The Return (1960)
 Judgment (1961)
 Broken Bridge (1962)
 Bathed in Fire (1963)
 The Colors of the Fight (1964)
 Justice Sunday (1965)
 The Big Bang (1966)
 The Day of the Purification (1969)
 The Last Days (1969)
 Kill the Black Sheep (1971)
 Janosik (1974)
 Victory (1974)
 Seagulls (1986)

References

External links
 
 Jerzy Passendorfer at the Filmpolski Database.

1923 births
2003 deaths
Members of the Polish Sejm 1993–1997
Polish film directors
Film people from Vilnius
Politicians from Vilnius